Panopeus is a genus of crabs, containing these extant species:

Panopeus africanus A. Milne-Edwards, 1867
Panopeus americanus Saussure, 1857
Panopeus austrobesus Williams, 1983
Panopeus boekei Rathbun, 1915
Panopeus chilensis H. Milne-Edwards & Lucas, 1843
Panopeus convexus A. Milne-Edwards, 1880
Panopeus diversus Rathbun. 1933
Panopeus harttii Smith, 1869
Panopeus herbstii H. Milne-Edwards, 1834
Panopeus lacustris Desbonne in Desbonne & Schramm, 1867
Panopeus meridionalis Williams, 1983
Panopeus obesus Smith, 1869
Panopeus occidentalis Saussure, 1857
Panopeus purpureus Lockington, 1877
Panopeus rugosus A. Milne-Edwards, 1880
Panopeus simpsoni Rathbun, 1930
Panopeus turgidus Rathbun, 1930

A similar number of fossil species is also known.

References

Xanthoidea
Taxa named by Henri Milne-Edwards